Dewi may refer to either a Welsh or Southeast Asian name. Neither is pronounced as "dewy".

Welsh name
Dewi (also  or ) is an alternate or diminutive form of the Welsh masculine given name Dafydd ("David").

It is most famously borne by the patron saint of Wales, Saint David.

It may also refer to:
Dewi Bebb, a Welsh rugby player
Dewi Bridges, a Welsh bishop
Dewi Griffiths, a Welsh television producer and radio host
Dewi Morgan, a Welsh bard
Dewi Morris, a rugby player who played for England
Dewi Nantbrân,
Dewi Zephaniah Phillips, a Welsh philosopher

Asian name
Dewi is also the Indonesian and Malay version of the Hindu devi ("goddess").

It may refer to:
Dewi Danu, the Balinese water goddess
Dewi Sri, the Javanese goddess of rice and fertility
"Dewi", a single by Indonesian singer Once
Dewi Persik, an Indonesian dangdut singer
Dewi Sartika, an Indonesian educator
Dewi Sandra, an Indonesian singer and model
Dewi Sukarno, former wife of Indonesian President Sukarno
Sandra Dewi, an Indonesian actress and model
Dewi Driegen, a part-Indonesian Dutch model
Dewi Claire Schreefel, a part-Indonesian Dutch golfer

Businesses
Dewi, an Indonesian fashion magazine

See also
 David (name)
 Davy (given name)
 Dafydd
 Dai (given name)
 Deva (disambiguation) and Dewa (disambiguation), variations of the male form of Dewi
 Dewey (given name)

Indonesian-language surnames
Surnames of Indonesian origin